Fabian Heinle (born 14 May 1994) is a German long jumper. Representing his nation Germany at the 2016 Summer Olympics, Heinle registered his best jump at 8.25 metres from the national meet in Oberteuringen a year before the Games. He currently trains under Hungarian-born coach Tamas Kiss for LAV Stadtwerke Tübingen in Stuttgart.

Heinle competed for Germany in the men's long jump at the 2016 Summer Olympics in Rio de Janeiro.  There, he spanned his opening legal jump at 7.64 metres, before producing a cautious foul on his second attempt. Heinle extended his third leap to a mark of 7.79 metres, but it was not enough to put him through to the final round, placing him in eighteenth out of thirty-two athletes.

Competition record

References

External links

 
 
 
 

1994 births
Living people
People from Esslingen (district)
Sportspeople from Stuttgart (region)
German male long jumpers
Olympic male long jumpers
Olympic athletes of Germany
Athletes (track and field) at the 2016 Summer Olympics
World Athletics Championships athletes for Germany
German national athletics champions
Athletes (track and field) at the 2020 Summer Olympics